Michael Andrew Long is a Northern Irish politician who served as the 80th Lord Mayor of Belfast from 9 May 2022 to 1 June 2022, finishing the remaining three weeks of Kate Nicholl's term after she was elected to the Northern Ireland Assembly in May 2022. He is married to leader of the Alliance Party and MLA for Belfast East Naomi Long.

Early life and education 
Michael Long was born in Kingston, Ontario in Canada to mother Elaine and father Adrian.

Political career

Member of Belfast City Council (2014-) 
In May 2014, Long was elected to Belfast City Council to represent the constituency of Lisnasharragh. Long would become the leader of Alliance in Belfast City Council.

Lord Mayor of Belfast (2022) 
In May 2022, incumbent Lord Mayor of Belfast Kate Nicholl was elected as an Alliance MLA for Belfast South. Her term was due to end on 1 June but was cut short due to rules prohibiting double-jobbing that forbid her from remaining as Lord Mayor of Belfast after being elected to the Assembly.

Michael Long was installed as the 80th Lord Mayor of Belfast on 9 May 2022 to serve the remaining three weeks in Nicholl's term. Long's three-week tenure made him the shortest serving Lord Mayor of Belfast. He is also the first spouse of a former Lord Mayor of Belfast to also serve in the post. Long's wife Naomi held the position from June 2009 to June 2010. When Long was installed as Lord Mayor on 9 May 2022, he spoke in both English and Irish and said that his predecessor was an "inspiration". Following on from Kate Nicholl, who was born in Zimbabwe, Long was the second Lord Mayor of Belfast in a row to be foreign-born.

On 1 June 2022, Long was succeeded by Tina Black of Sinn Féin as Lord Mayor of Belfast.

Personal life 
Long met his wife Naomi when they were teenagers and they married in 1995.

On 23 April 2022, Long's father Adrian, a civil engineer, died. His funeral was held on 5 May, the same day as the 2022 Assembly election.

References

External links 

Living people
Year of birth missing (living people)
People from Kingston, Ontario
Lord Mayors of Belfast
21st-century politicians from Northern Ireland
Alliance Party of Northern Ireland politicians